The Golden Bowl is a 1972 British television series which originally aired on BBC 2 in six episodes. It is an adaptation of the 1904 novel The Golden Bowl by Henry James.

Cast
 Barry Morse as Adam Verver
 Jill Townsend as Maggie Verver
 Daniel Massey as  Prince Amerigo
 Gayle Hunnicutt as  Charlotte Stant 
 Cyril Cusack as Bob Assingham 
 Kathleen Byron as Fanny Assingham
 Carl Bernard as  Shopkeeper
 Anna Fox as Lady Castledean
 Angus MacKay as  Lord Castledean
 Hilary Minster as Guest
 Donald Gray as  Sir John Brinder 
 Andrea Addison as  Guest
 Sarah Brackett as  Mrs. Rance
 Elizabeth Chambers as  Margaret
 Deborah Davies as  Guest
 Mischa De La Motte as Harold
 Freddie Earlle as  Calderoni
 Billy Franks as Page
 Henry Goodman as Secretary
 Terry Mitchell as Mr. Blint
 Jonathan Scott as  Harper
 Marguerite Young as  Mrs. Noble

References

Bibliography
Baskin, Ellen. Serials on British Television, 1950-1994. Scolar Press, 1996.

External links
 

BBC television dramas
1972 British television series debuts
1972 British television series endings
1970s British drama television series
1970s British television miniseries
English-language television shows
Television shows based on American novels